The 1997 South Asian Football Federation Gold Cup was held in Kathmandu, Nepal between 4 and 13 September. India won the championship after defeating Maldives in the final.

Venues

Group stage

Group A

Group B

Knockout phase

Bracket

Semi-finals

Third-place match

Final

Champion

References

 

1997
1997 in Nepalese sport
International association football competitions hosted by Nepal
1997 in Asian football
20th century in Kathmandu